This is a list of college women's basketball coaches by number of career wins. The list includes other NCAA, AIAW and NAIA levels.  Tara VanDerveer, the head coach of Idaho from 1978–80, Ohio State from 1980-85, and Stanford since 1985 (with a hiatus in 1995–96 to coach the US Olympic team), tops the list with 1,157 career wins. The highest winning percentage in the group belongs to Geno Auriemma, head coach of the UConn Huskies since 1985, with an  career winning percentage. The fastest coach to reach 600 wins is Brian Morehouse, current head coach of the Division III Hope Flying Dutch, who reached the mark in his 690th game on January 25, 2020.

NCAA and NAIA women's basketball coaches with 600 wins

Key

The source for all statistics and schedules for NCAA teams is https://stats.ncaa.org/head_coaches''

Sources for NAIA teams are specified in the relevant entries.

Coaches

Statistics updated at the end of the 2021-22 season.

See also
WBCA National Coach of the Year
Naismith College Coach of the Year
AP Coach of the Year
USBWA Women's National Coach of the Year
List of college men's basketball coaches with 600 wins

References

 
College women's basketball records and statistics in the United States
Basketball, Women's
Basketball